East Lothian is a constituency of the Scottish Parliament (Holyrood) covering most of the council area of East Lothian. It elects one Member of the Scottish Parliament (MSP) by the plurality (first past the post) method of election. It is also one of nine constituencies in the South Scotland electoral region, which elects seven additional members, in addition to the nine constituency MSPs, to produce a form of proportional representation for the region as a whole.

The seat has been held by Paul McLennan of the Scottish National Party since the 2021 Scottish Parliament election.

Electoral region 

The other eight constituencies of the South Scotland region are Ayr, Carrick, Cumnock and Doon Valley, Clydesdale, Dumfriesshire, Ettrick, Roxburgh and Berwickshire, Galloway and West Dumfries, Kilmarnock and Irvine Valley and Midlothian South, Tweeddale and Lauderdale.

The region covers the Dumfries and Galloway council area, part of the East Ayrshire council area, part of the East Lothian council area, part of the Midlothian council area, the Scottish Borders council area, the South Ayrshire council area and part of the South Lanarkshire council area.

Constituency boundaries and council area 

The East Lothian constituency was created at the same time as the Scottish Parliament, in 1999, with the name and boundaries of an  existing Westminster constituency. In 2005, however, Scottish Westminster (House of Commons) constituencies were mostly replaced with new constituencies. Following their first Periodic Review into Scottish Parliament constituencies, the Boundary Commission for Scotland recommended the formation of a modified East Lothian, with the Musselburgh electorate wards part of a redrawn Midlothian North and Musselburgh constituency, which was first used for the 2011 Scottish Parliament election.

The Holyrood constituency covers most of the East Lothian council area. The remainder is represented by the Midlothian North and Musselburgh constituency.

East Lothian is formed from the electoral wards listed below. All of these wards are part of East Lothian.

In full: Dunbar and East Linton, Haddington and Lammermuir, North Berwick Coastal, Preston, Seton and Gosford
In part: Tranent/Wallyford/Macmerry (shared with Midlothian North and Musselburgh constituency)

Member of the Scottish Parliament

Election results

2020s

This was the only SNP gain from Labour at the 2021 Scottish Parliament election.

2010s

2000s

1990s

Footnotes

External links

Constituencies of the Scottish Parliament
Politics of East Lothian
Scottish Parliament constituencies and regions from 2011
1999 establishments in Scotland
Constituencies established in 1999
Scottish Parliament constituencies and regions 1999–2011
Prestonpans
Tranent
Haddington, East Lothian
Dunbar
North Berwick